Another Late Night: Rae & Christian is the second DJ mix album, mixed by Grand Central Records artists Rae & Christian.
It was released on 1 March 2001 on Late Night Tales in the UK and on Kinetic Records in the USA. It was the third in the Another Late Night / Late Night Tales series of DJ mixes, each CD being mixed by a different DJ or recording artist, including Zero 7, Groove Armada, Tommy Guerrero, The Flaming Lips and Jamiroquai.

Track listing
 "Heavy Worker" - Trendsetter
 "Copenhagen (Claimin' Respect)" - The Boulevard Connection
 "Come On" - Joshua
 "Put That on My Momma" - Riton
 "Introlude" - Dubble D
 "100 Million Ways" - Nash
 "Straight No Filter" (Only Child Remix) - Fumi
 "Take Ya Time" - Zum
 "Four (4 x 3)" (Mr. Scruff Remix) - Capoeira Twins
 "I Pink I'm Going Squeezy" - Bushy vs. Sonic Boo
 "Roll Call" - Pablo
 "Got to Be Me" (Timezone Dub) - H2O
 "Strudel Strut" - Aromadozeski Therapy
 "Samba" (Rae & Christian Remix) - Faze Action
 "Flashlight" - Rae & Christian
 "Mary Jane" - Rick James
 "California Dreamin'" - Jose Feliciano

References

External links
 Late Night Tales: Rae & Christian

Rae and Christian
2001 compilation albums
Rae & Christian albums